Dr. Theogene Rudasingwa (born 1960) is a leading figure in the Rwanda National Congress and a former Chief of Staff to Rwandan President Paul Kagame (2000-2004), former General Secretary of the Rwandan ruling party, the Rwandan Patriotic Front (RPF), and former ambassador to the United States from 1996 to 1999. Rudasingwa has been in exile in the U.S. since 2004 after falling out with President Kagame, and was recently sentenced to 24 years in jail by a Rwandan court on charges that may have been politically motivated. Rudasingwa was born outside Rwanda and has lived most of his life outside the country.

Rudasingwa was one of those who gave evidence in 2013 in Spain relating to charges of genocide and war crimes by Rwandan Patriotic Army (RPA) and RPF figures in Rwanda and the Democratic Republic of the Congo between 1994 and 2000. Rudasingwa was himself a Major at the time.

References

External links
Theogene Rudasingwa statement on the death of President Juvenal Habyarimana of Rwanda.

Living people
1960 births
Rwanda National Congress politicians
Rwandan exiles
Ambassadors of Rwanda to the United States